Mary Point Estate is a historic property located on the north coast of Saint John, United States Virgin Islands on Mary's Point. The plantation was added to the U.S. National Register of Historic Places on May 22, 1978.

History
The land on which Mary Point Estate is located was originally held by Danish West India and Guinea Company officials during the early years of Danish settlement. Not being prime land for planting, the land was held until new settlers needed property. The van Stell family was the first controlling landholding on Mary's Point.

In the aftermath of the 1733 slave insurrection on St. John, Franz Claasen was deeded the Mary's Point estate for alerting the family of the rebellion and assisting in their escape to St. Thomas, a nearby island. Franz Claasen's land deed was recorded on August 20, 1738, by Jacob van Stell. Claasen was the first "Free Colored" landowner on St. John.

Augustus Kragh and the Grancis family were owners of the Mary Point Estate during the late 18th century. Hans Hendrik Berg, a governor and president of St. John and St. Thomas, was an owner of the Mary Point Estate during the 19th century. During this time an L-shaped factory and the one-story Great House were constructed on the property. In addition to the Great House, a servant's quarters, farm building, and cemetery remain.

Gallery

References

External links

  LOC.gov: HABS−Historic American Buildings Survey of Estate Mary Point, Great House, Adrian, St. John, Virgin Islands 
HABS: Estate Mary Point, Great House drawings
HABS: Estate Mary Point, Great House photos
Wikimedia Commons: Great House at Estate Mary Point  images

Plantations in the United States Virgin Islands
National Register of Historic Places in Virgin Islands National Park
Saint John, U.S. Virgin Islands
Ruins in the United States
Buildings and structures on the National Register of Historic Places in the United States Virgin Islands
Historic districts on the National Register of Historic Places in the United States Virgin Islands
Houses on the National Register of Historic Places in the United States Virgin Islands
1770s establishments in North America
1770s establishments in the Caribbean
1770s establishments in Denmark
18th century in the Danish West Indies
19th century in the Danish West Indies